"Wexler v. Goodman" is the sixth episode of the fifth season of the AMC television series Better Call Saul, a spin-off series of Breaking Bad. The episode aired on March 23, 2020, on AMC in the United States. Outside of the United States, the episode premiered on the streaming service Netflix in several countries.

Plot

Opening
In a flashback to Kim Wexler's teenage years in Red Cloud, Nebraska, her mother is late picking her up from school because she has been drinking. Kim refuses to ride home with her and walks away. Kim's mother angrily yells that Kim never listens to her.

Main Story
Jimmy McGill's camera crew and local actors film at the nail salon. Kim arrives and tells Jimmy she does not want to attempt to blackmail Kevin Wachtell and offers a settlement to Everett Acker, with Kim personally making up the difference between what Kevin agrees to and a $75,000 payment. Jimmy reluctantly agrees to stop the scheme. After representing two prostitutes in court, Jimmy pranks Howard Hamlin by paying them to falsely claim he owes them money at his business lunch with Clifford Main.

Nacho Varga meets with Gus Fring, Victor, and Mike Ehrmantraut. He reports on Lalo Salamanca's plans to reveal the locations of Gus's street dealers to the police. Gus tells Victor to ensure that only low-level employees are arrested and if necessary, to hire new ones to sacrifice. Gus tells Nacho that from now on, he will report to Mike. After Gus leaves, Nacho warns Mike about Gus's ruthlessness, including threatening Nacho's father, but Mike reminds Nacho that he told Nacho of the risk he took by trying to kill Hector Salamanca. Mike discreetly feeds police information about Lalo's car and its connection to Fred Whalen's murder before using a tip from Nacho to have police converge on Lalo's location and detain him.

Jimmy meets with Kim, Rich Schweikart, Kevin Wachtell, and Paige Novick to complete Acker's settlement and stuns everyone by demanding $4 million. When Kevin ridicules him, Jimmy shows his video: rough cuts of commercials seeking plaintiffs for class-action lawsuits against Mesa Verde, which unfavorably depict Kevin's father, Don Wachtell. Kim's insight from Sobchak's photos of Kevin's house is that Mesa Verde's logo is based on a photograph the bank did not obtain permission to use. Jimmy uses the threat of lawsuits and an injunction against displaying the logo to persuade Kevin to accept a settlement that includes cash for Acker and the photographer.

When Kim comes home, Jimmy is apprehensive but says Kim and he should celebrate. Kim vents her anger at Jimmy for making her the "sucker" in his con. She says they either need to end their relationship or get married.

Production
The name of the Native American photographer referenced in the episode, Olivia Bitsui, is a reference to the daughter of actor Jeremiah Bitsui, who plays Victor. When Kim arrives home, Jimmy is playing the guitar riff from the Deep Purple song "Smoke on the Water." This is the same song Jimmy's con artist partner Marco was humming when he died, and the same one Jimmy was humming when he left the courthouse parking lot after initially turning down the job offer with Davis & Main. The guitar he plays is the one he acquired from the music store owners when he staged a slip and fall accident after they refused to pay for the commercial he produced for them, another occasion when he played "Smoke on the Water."

Reception
"Wexler v. Goodman" was acclaimed by critics. On Rotten Tomatoes, it received a perfect 100% approval from 13 reviews with an average 9/10 review rating, with a summary "Like a cookie full of arsenic, 'Wexler V. Goodman' delivers the fun and the toxic, enthralling viewers with Jimmy's plan before delivering a series of gut punches they aren't soon to forget."

Ratings
"Wexler v. Goodman" was watched by 1.40 million viewers on its first broadcast, which was a slight decrease from the previous week of 1.45 million.

Notelist

References

External links
 "Wexler v. Goodman" at AMC
 

Better Call Saul (season 5) episodes